A Pure Michigan Byway is the designation for a segment of the State Trunkline Highway System in the US state of Michigan that is a "scenic, recreational, or historic route that is representative of Michigan's natural and cultural heritage." The designation was created with the name Michigan Heritage Route by the state legislature on June 22, 1993, and since then six historic, seven recreational and seven scenic byways have been designated by the Michigan Department of Transportation (MDOT), and another two have been proposed. These byways have been designated in both the Upper and Lower peninsulas (UP, LP) of the state. The current name was adopted on December 30, 2014, and it references the Pure Michigan tourism marketing campaign.

To be listed as a Pure Michigan Byway, a road must be a state trunkline highway, and it must be nominated through a two-stage process. Candidates are evaluated based on a set of objective criteria by MDOT in a process that can take several years to complete. The criteria include a highway's relationship to sites or districts on the National Register of Historic Places, to recreational areas, or to scenic landscapes. Each candidate must be supported by local stakeholders, including the appropriate local units of government. Each byway has a local organization that produces a management plan for the roadway and the preservation of its surrounding environment.

Program
According to MDOT, the department's Pure Michigan Byway Program works with local communities, organizations, and government agencies to identify roads that access Michigan's "unique recreational, scenic and historic cultural treasures". The program also attempts to preserve the unique and irreplaceable qualities of selected corridors, improve distinct roads in a careful and considerate way, and promote a greater awareness of and appreciation for the state's scenic, recreational, historical and cultural resources, according to the  Federal Highway Administration. These actions provide economic benefits by stimulating tourism. Staffers for State Representative Peter Pettalia of Presque Isle said that the point of the program, in context of the 2014 change to the Pure Michigan Byway name, was to get people to drive the selected roads and spend money at local businesses.

Additions to the system are made when local organizations apply to MDOT through a two-stage process. First, a local organization proposes the addition, verifying that the suggested heritage route is a state trunkline highway and noting which local governments support the designation. MDOT reviews this pre-application to determine initial eligibility. If the proposed byway is determined to be eligible, the organization is asked to submit a full application to the department for approval. The full process can take up to seven years to complete. The MDOT director compiles a report annually that is submitted to the governor, members of the Michigan Legislature and members of the State Transportation Commission; this report details any new additions in the previous year and any changes or deletions affecting the system.

Types and requirements
The three types of byways are defined in Public Act 69 of 1993, the legislation that originally established the system. The Legislature defined these types to be:
Historic
significant to the history, archeology, architecture, engineering, or culture of this state.
Recreational
facilities normally associated with leisure-time activities, including, but not limited to, parks, public access sites, wildlife refuges, forest areas, marinas, swimming areas, hiking trails, and sightseeing areas.
Scenic
an area of outstanding natural beauty whose features include, but are not limited to, significant natural features such as vegetation, land form, water, and open areas with exceptional vistas and views, that singly or in combination make that area unique and distinct in character.

In his annual report to the State Legislature at the end of 2014, MDOT Director Kirk Steudle described an additional three categories of byway not listed in the legislation setting up the system.
Cultural
A state highway traversing an area with unique cultural and/or ethnic heritage amenities such as art galleries, theaters, opera houses, restaurants, markets, and music venues.
Archaeological
A state highway traversing a corridor with ruins, artifacts, and structural remains.
Natural
A state highway that traverses a corridor with natural features that are relatively undisturbed, unique geological landforms, vegetation, water bodies, or conservation areas.

In establishing specific objective criteria related to the selection of potential byways, MDOT has set up limitations on these classifications. Regardless of classification, all byways are supported with a management plan for the corridor designed to deal with protection, preservation, and enhancement of the roadway. All routes are given specific termini points with a reasonable length. They must also have the backing of local units of government, landowners and organizations. No specific criteria have been published for cultural, archaeological or natural byways.

Historic byways are assessed based on the numbers of sites listed, or eligible for listing, on the National Register of Historic Places. These sites need to be visible from the route of the byway, or, in the case of historic districts, a "substantial portion of the district must lie adjacent to the highway". Local organizations backing a proposed historic byway must also have promotional plans and demonstrate coordination with state agencies related to state history.

Recreational byways must be used mainly for recreational purposes, connecting to one or more recreation sites. They can also connect multiple sites together with a common theme, and they are assessed on their scenic qualities with lower inclusion standards than scenic byways.

Scenic byways must exclude commercial or industrial zones adjacent to the trunkline. These roads are also assessed on qualities such as the uniqueness, vividness, intactness, unity, and viewshed of the roadway and its surrounding environment as set up in department guidelines.

History

The Michigan Heritage Route System was created after Public Act 69 of 1993 was signed into law on June 22, 1993, going into effect immediately. The law required MDOT to set up specific criteria and procedures related to selecting and maintaining heritage routes, subject to approval of the Legislature. Since the program was put into operation in 1993, 16 heritage routes have been approved by the department. The first two were approved in 1995 at opposite ends of the state: a scenic route along US Highway 41 (US 41) in the Keweenaw Peninsula region of the northern UP and a historic route along M-125 in downtown Monroe in the southeastern corner of the LP. The first recreational route was approved in 1998 along M-15 in the southeastern LP.  Since 2008, local groups have proposed the creation of a heritage route along the former West Michigan Pike (US 31) on the western side of the LP and a loop around Ontonagon County in the western UP. In a department report dated December 22, 2014, the UP byway was no longer under active proposal, and the West Michigan Pike was dedicated on July 25, 2016.

The Legislature proposed another change to the system in 2013 to rename the Heritage Routes in the system to Pure Michigan Byways under a bill introduced in the state House of Representatives. The bill passed in the House in March 2014, and the state Senate during the lame duck session in December 2014. Sponsors of the bill said that including the highways in the Pure Michigan tourism advertising campaign would provide promotional benefits, and they stated that the change "allows the state to comply with federal changes, which require the word 'route' be changed to 'byway'." The bill received the governor's signature and was filed on December 30, 2014, taking effect as Public Act 445 that day. MDOT had one year from that effective date to obtain a trademark license from the Michigan Economic Development Corporation, owners of the Pure Michigan trademark, and to unveil the new signage bearing the updated program name. They unveiled the new signage as part of the dedication of the M-134 North Huron Byway in October 2015.

List
There are six historic, seven recreational and six scenic byways in Michigan, with one additional route proposed.

See also

Michigan has three National Forest Scenic Byways that run along county roads and a National Park Service-maintained scenic drive, which are ineligible to be Pure Michigan Byways:
Black River National Forest Scenic Byway
River Road National Forest Scenic Byway (also a National Scenic Byway)
Whitefish Bay National Forest Scenic Byway
Pierce Stocking Scenic Drive

References

External links

Pure Michigan Byways (Michigan Heritage Routes) at Michigan Highways

 01
Pure Michigan Byway